Alistipes indistinctus is a Gram-negative, anaerobic, non-spore-forming and non-motile bacterium from the genus of Alistipes which has been isolated from human faeces from Tokyo in Japan.

References

Bacteria described in 2010
Bacteroidia